April Scott is an actress.

April Scott may also refer to:

April Scott (Home and Away)
April Scott, character in The Dead Outside